Loch Arienas is an extensive, lowland, freshwater loch on the Ardtornish Estate on the Morvern peninsula in the Scottish Highlands. The northern shore of the loch is mostly regular in shape, while the southern shore is irregular. The loch was surveyed on the 18 and 19 of August 1904 by John Hewitt as part of Sir John Murray's Bathymetrical Survey of Fresh-Water Lochs of Scotland 1897-1909.

The loch holds native wild brown trout and permits are required to fish the loch.

In the wood on the northern shore of the loch are the remains of charcoal burners’ huts and charcoal platforms. There is also a stone dyke dating from approximately 1780, which may have been used to enclose the wood to protect it from grazing animals.

References 

Arienas
Arienas